I. K. Gujral Punjab Technical University (IKGPTU), formerly Punjab Technical University (PTU), is a State university located by Kapurthala highway in Kapurthala, India. It was established by an act of State Legislature on 16 January 1997, to promote technical, management and pharmaceutical education in the state of Punjab at the degree level and above. Being an education and research university, it has a mandate to set up centres of excellence in emerging technologies for promoting training and research and development in these areas.

History
The Punjab Technical University was established by an act of State Legislature on 16 January 1997 with a handful of institutes (colleges), i.e. 9 engineering & 5 management colleges. , the university administrates 290 affiliated colleges, out of which 102 are engineering and management, 146 are UGC courses colleges, 36 are pharmacy and 06 are architecture with 33 regional centres. The university has a land area of 78.16 acre and it owns 7 campuses located at Kapurthala, Hoshiarpur, Amritsar, Mohali 01, Mohali 02 (Khoonimajra), Batala & Bhikhiwind. 

Further, the university provides undergraduate and post graduate courses in most of the technical, management, hotel management, architect, pharmacy  fields. It is currently undertaking and supervising the instructions and awards of 08 AICTE courses, 01 COA (Council for Architecture) course, 04 PCI (Pharmacy council of India) & 18 UGC (University Grants Commission) courses. 
Having 07 campuses and 290 affiliated colleges across the state of Punjab (India), the university provides education to more than 1.5 Lac students from India and 30+ foreign states.

In recognition of contribution made by the former Prime Minister late I. K. Gujral towards the overall development and prosperity of Punjab, the Cabinet gave nod to rename the Punjab Technical University Jalandhar as IK Gujral Punjab Technical University A decision to this effect was taken at a meeting of the Cabinet chaired by Punjab Chief Minister Parkash Singh Badal in November 2013 and implemented with act amendment in 2015. (reference www.ptu.ac.in)

Campuses

Amritsar 
The Amritsar campus was established in 2014 to provide Quality Technical Education especially to students from rural belt belonging to weaker sections of society and to people of all sections in general. The main focus is to produce Quality Engineers according to the needs of Industry at State, National and International levels. IKGPTU Amritsar Campus has prime location on G.T Road, Amritsar near Guru Nanak Dev University. It has vast campus having smart classrooms, well equipped labs, updated library with latest collection of books, and a well-equipped conference hall with audio-video facilities.

 Courses offered
 M. Tech. – Computer Science & Engineering (CSE)	2 Years / 4 Semesters
 B. Tech. – Computer Science & Engineering (CSE)	4 Years / 8 Semesters
 B. Tech. – Mechanical Engineering (ME)	4 Years / 8 Semesters
 Bachelor of Computer Applications (BCA)	3 Years / 6 Semesters

Hoshiarpur 
The Hoshiarpur campus, formerly known as (Punjab Institute of Technology (PIT, Hoshiarpur), was established in the year 2013 by I. K. Gujral Punjab Technical University, Jalandhar, with the vision to spread quality education in the region which is vastly covered by Kandi area.
 
 Courses Offered
 B.Tech (Civil Engg.), After Diploma Engg.	3 years / 6 Semesters
 B.Tech (Mechanical Engg.) After 10+2 Non Medical	4 Years / 8 Semesters
 B.Tech (Mechanical Engg.) After Diploma	3 Years / 6 Semesters
 B.Tech (CSE), After 10+2 Non Medical	4 Years / 8 Semesters
 B.Tech (CSE), After Diploma Engg.	3 years/ 6 Semester
 BCA	3 years / 6 Semesters

Mohali 
Mohali is rapidly developing the “IT Hub” of Punjab and has emerged as one of the most important cities in northern India. It is rated among the best place for higher education in Punjab.
The Mohali campus is located in the heart of the Mohali and well connected through roads and railways and to the outside world by the international airport. It is the only Gojydbvt. Engineering College run by IKGPTU Kapurthala in Mohali. The mission of IKGPTU Mohali campus-1 is to become fountainhead of technologies.

Mohali (campus 2) 
Mohali campus 2 is a constituent campus of IKG PTU Jalandhar. It started functioning in 2014 as a ‘School of Built environment’ to provide quality education to the students both at undergraduate and post graduate level to cater to the needs of Building industry. The target do not end at just producing Architects/Engineers with B. Arch., B. Tech or Master’s program but also to encourage research and to have R&D section in various disciplines. The programs to be started in the institute would be in conformity with the present and futuristic need of the industry and to achieve this objective. Efforts will be made to make our Labs, Library and Computer Centre etc. as per the latest state of art technology.

 Courses offered
 B.Arch
 BSc (Architecture Basics)
 M.Arch (Arch. Education and Research)
 M.Planning

Academics

Admission 
For the undergraduate curriculum, admission to the BTech programme is done through the Joint Entrance Examination.

Ranking 

The National Institutional Ranking Framework (NIRF) ranked it 104 among engineering colleges in 2020.

Library facility

The PTU Library has accessioned 8856 text and reference books, 973 complementary books and more than 1000 thesis.

Research
I. K. Gujral Punjab Technical University's research program has made significant progress over the last decade. At present, PTU offers PhD in 21 disciplines (with a great variety of sub-specializations). The total number of research students enrolled in the PhD program exceeds 1600.

The number of recognised PhD supervisors in the PTU system stood at 447 as of 30 Oct 2014 spread over 30+ cities and small towns.

Notable alumni 
 Charanjit Singh Channi
 Deepika Singh
 Bharti Singh
 Gurpartap Singh Mann
 Hargovind Bhargava
Mohana Singh Jitarwal
AP Dhillon

See also
 List of colleges and institutes affiliated with Technical Universities of Punjab (India)

References

 
Universities in Punjab, India
All India Council for Technical Education
Education in Jalandhar
1997 establishments in Punjab, India
Educational institutions established in 1997